The Florentine dialect or vernacular ( or ) is a variety of Tuscan, a Romance language spoken in the Italian city of Florence and its immediate surroundings. 

A received pedagogical variant derived from it historically, once called  (literally, 'the amended Florentine pronunciation').

Literature
Important writers such as Dante Alighieri, Francesco Petrarch, Giovanni Boccaccio and, later, Niccolò Machiavelli and Francesco Guicciardini wrote in literary Tuscan/Florentine, perhaps the best-known example being Dante's Divine Comedy.

Differences from Standard Italian
Florentine, and Tuscan more generally, can be distinguished from Standard Italian by differences in numerous features at all levels: phonology, morphology, syntax and lexicon.

Similar alternations obtain for  → , and  → ,.  

The word gelato is pronounced with  following a pause or a consonant,  following a vowel and  if raddoppiamento applies (un gelato,  quattro gelati,  tre gelati. In both cases, the weakest variant appears between vowels ( regione 'region',  quattro gelati;  la cena,  bacio 'kiss').

Examples:
(Florentine dialect, standard Italian, English):

 Io sòn = io sono = I am
 Te tu sei = tu sei = you are
 Egli l'è = egli è = he/she/it is
 Noi s'è/semo = noi siamo = we are
 Voi vù siete = voi siete = you are
 Essi l'enno = essi sono = they are
 Io c'ho = io ho = I have
 Te tu c'hai = te hai = you have
 Egli c'ha = egli ha = he/she/it has
 Noi ci s'ha = noi abbiamo = we have
 Voi vù c'avete = voi avete = you have
 Essi c'hanno = essi hanno = they have
Source:

References

Giacomelli, Gabriella. 1975. Dialettologia toscana. Archivio glottologico italiano 60, pp. 179-191. 
Giannelli, Luciano. 2000. Toscana. (Profilo dei dialetti italiani, 9). Pisa: Pacini.

 
Florence